R B Holle (Rajaram B. Holle) (born 9 June 1973) is an Indian contemporary painter. He is awarded Pollock-Krasner Foundation Grant, New York in 2012, National Award in Lalit Kala Akademi by Govt. Of India in 2012.

Holle was born in 1973, in remote village, Kasari, Pune in the western Indian state of Maharashtra. He received his art diploma from the Abhinav Kala Mahavidyalaya, Pune in 1999 (1st in State-Received a Gold Medal).

Solo exhibitions 

 2019 FEI Art Museum Yokohama, Japan.
 2018 MIIT Museo, Turin, Italy organized by Pundole Art Gallery.
 2017 Carrion Gallery, Venice, Italy.
 2017 Kokonton Gallery, Venice, Italy.
 2012 Jehangir Art Gallery, Mumbai, organized by Pundole Art Gallery.
 2010 Pundole Art Gallery, Mumbai.
 2008 Troubadour art Gallery, London.
 2004 Apparao Galleries, Chennai.
 2003 W.F. Art Gallery, New York.

Collections 

 Lalit Kala Akademi, New Delhi.
 Pundole Art Gallery, Mumbai.
 Indo-American Art Council, New York.
 Hutheesing Visual Art Centre, Ahmedabad.
 Apparao Galleries, Chennai.
 Atasi Art, Pune.
 MIIT Museo, Turin, Italy.

Awards 
 2022  Nelson Mandela Nobel Peace Award.
 2022  Honorary Doctrate (art & culture), St. Mother Theresa University, U.K.
 2018  The Tata Trusts Travel Grant, India.
 2012  Pollock-Krasner Foundation Grant, New York.
 2012  National Award, Lalit Kala Academy, Govt of India.
 2006  Junior Fellowship, Cultural Dep., Govt. of India.
 2001  ‘National Scholarship’, Lalit Kala Academy New Delhi.
 1999  Gold Medal, Maharashtra State.

Major works 

 Pundole Art Gallery, Mumbai.
 Lalit Kala Academy, Govt of India.
 Apparao Gallery, Chennai.

References

External links 
 http://www.pkf-imagecollection.org/artist/R.B._Holle/works/
 https://www.thehindu.com/todays-paper/tp-features/tp-metroplus/inspired-by-nature/article28200208.ece
 https://www.nettam.jp/bbs/detail.php?no=22054
 https://www.share-art.jp/event/views/275746
 https://rental-gallery.jp/exhibition/39238/
 https://loco.yahoo.co.jp/event/3a4f1ae95c3d99b8b267c94f77fe7edd54834e2f/
 http://www.artgene.net/detail.php?EID=29923

1973 births
Living people
Indian contemporary painters